Skjern  may refer to:
 Skjern Municipality, a former municipality in Region Midtjylland in west Denmark
 Skjern River, the largest river in Denmark by volume
 Skjern, Denmark, a railway town in western Jutland, Denmark